Frederick VI of Hohenstaufen (February 1167 – 20 January 1191) was duke of Swabia from 1170 until his death at the siege of Acre.

Life

Born in Modigliana in the Italian region of Emilia-Romagna, he was the third son of Frederick I Barbarossa and Beatrice I, Countess of Burgundy. Originally named Conrad, he took the name of Frederick after the death of his eldest brother Frederick V, Duke of Swabia in 1170; also, he succeeded him as Duke Frederick VI of Swabia, being the sixth in unbroken succession Duke of Swabia with the leading Staufen name of Frederick.

In the older literature, Conrad/Frederick VI's older brother and predecessor Duke Frederick V of Swabia was partly overlooked, because was thought to be identical to as Conrad/Frederick VI, and for this reason he was therefore not counted as Frederick VI, but referred to as Frederick V. The fact that a younger brother born in 1172, the later Conrad II, Duke of Swabia, was given the name Conrad, which had been able to use because Conrad/Frederick VI renaming and which also had a long tradition within the Staufen dynasty, creates additional confusion when identifying these three sons of Frederick I Barbarossa.

Frederick I Barbarossa appointed the noble Degenhard von Hellenstein as Prokurator (Governor) for the Duchy of Swabia while his son was underage. In 1179 the Emperor granted to Frederick VI in addition to the Duchy of Swabia, some areas acquired in Upper Swabia and Bavaria on the basis of contracts of inheritance with Duke Welf I of Bavaria and Count Rudolf of Pfullendorf. For the first a lion was found on a Hohenstaufen coat of arms in a seal of Frederick VI dated around 1181. This design was in also in a 1220 seal of Duke Henry of Swabia, later Staufen King Henry (VII) of Germany. The extended version of this seal with a three-lion crest was currently part of the Coat of arms of Baden-Württemberg.

In 1181 Frederick VI was betrothed to a seven-years-old daughter of King Valdemar I of Denmark, whose identity is uncertain. After the brother of the bride and new King Canute VI of Denmark refused to give half of her dowry, the Emperor decided to send the princess (who had been living in Germany for five years at the time in preparation for her marriage) back to Denmark in 1187 still a virgin (lat: intacta). The Danish princess could be Ingeborg —whose assumed birth year was around 1175 and would fit with the repudiated child bride—, who later had an unhappy marriage with King Philip II of France.

At the Diet of Pentecost in Mainz on 20 May 1184, Frederick VI, together with his brother Henry VI, King of the Romans, personally received the accolade from their father. The Emperor's sons and many princes, who followed their example and did not want to be inferior to them in this respect, gave the knights and minstrels gifts in the form of horses, precious clothes, gold and silver. This was followed by a riding event called gyrum, at which the knights showed their skills in swinging shields, banners and lances. Among the alleged 20,000 participants were the emperor and his sons. The next day the riding events continued. In the following week fighting games were to take place in Ingelheim. However, a storm caused several tents and the wooden church to collapse and also caused deaths among the celebrants. This was interpreted as a divine sign and the celebration was not continued.

On 27 March 1188, Frederick VI made a solemn oath to join his father on the Third Crusade. On 11 May 1189, he set out with the Crusader army from Regensburg. In his journey he arrived to the Kingdom of Hungary, where he was betrothed to Constance, a daughter of King Béla III, an ally of Barbarossa. Frederick VI's early death in the Crussade prevented the marriage from proceeding; some years later, in 1198, Constance became in the second wife of King Ottokar I of Bohemia.

As part of his father's army, Frederick VI commanded the van while Barbarossa commanded the rearguard. Upon hearing his father's troops were under attack, he rushed back on horseback with his troops to reinforce them. However, he also had an important role at both the Battle of Philomelion and Battle of Iconium in May 1190. Following his father's death on 10 June 1190 in the Saleph River in the Armenian Kingdom of Cilicia, Frederick VI took command of the German forces and led them south towards Antioch. Although a large number of the Crusaders left the army and sailed from Antioch to their homeland, Frederick VI wanted to move to Jerusalem with his remaining army. In Tripoli, a large part of his companions became ill on malaria, which is why only around 700 knights arrived with him in early October 1190 to besiege the city of Acre. While at Acre Frederick VI wrote his brother, Henry VI, asking for him to gain papal recognition for the hospital at Acre. Also sick with malaria, Frederick VI died on 20 January 1191 and was buried in Acre. Because the city is still from Saladin's Troops were occupied, the remaining crusaders were unable to enter the city and left the Holy Land after Frederick VI's death.

See also
Dukes of Swabia family tree

References

Sources
 
 
 
 
 
 
 
 
 
 
 

1167 births
1191 deaths
People from Modigliana
Dukes of Swabia
Christians of the Third Crusade
Sons of kings
Sons of emperors